Gentofte-Vangede Idrætsforening (commonly known as GVI) is a Danish football club based in the Copenhagen suburban area Vangede. The club was founded 21 August 1921 and has since the foundation been playing at Nymosen Sports Park. The club was founded as merger between Gentofte Boldklub and Vangede Idrætsforening before the start of the 1921–22 tournament administrated by the Zealand Football Association (SBU). The founding clubs had previously been part of Nordre Birks Boldspil-Union and Københavns Forstadsklubbers Bold Union (KFBU), before being accepted as members of SBU during a general meeting on 29 May 1921.

The club is currently playing in the Denmark Series.

References

External links 
 Official site 
 Official shop 

Football clubs in Denmark
Association football clubs established in 1921
1921 establishments in Denmark
Football clubs in Copenhagen